Verrucaria takagoensis is a species of saxicolous (rock-dwelling), crustose lichen in the family Verrucariaceae. Found in semi-freshwater habitats in Chiba Prefecture, central Japan, it was formally described as a new species in 2001 by lichenologist Hiroshi Harada. The lichen has almost spherical, exposed black perithecia measuring 0.1–0.2 mm in diameter, with brownish-black perithecial walls, and lacking a distinct involucrellum. The periphyses are 5–10 μm long with pointed apices, while its ascospores measure 6–8 by 4–5 μm. Verrucaria takagoensis has a translucent or almost transparent (semipellucid) brownish, thin thallus.

See also
List of Verrucaria species

References

takagoensis
Lichen species
Lichens described in 2001
Lichens of Japan